The 2008 Allianz Suisse Open Gstaad was a men's tennis tournament played on outdoor clay courts. It was the 41st edition of the Allianz Suisse Open Gstaad, and was part of the International Series of the 2008 ATP Tour. It took place at the Roy Emerson Arena in Gstaad, Switzerland, from 7 July through 13 July 2008.

The singles draw featured ATP No. 10, Rome Masters and Doha runner-up Stanislas Wawrinka, Marseille and Munich semifinalist, and Gstaad defending champion Paul-Henri Mathieu, and Australian Open quarterfinalist and Chennai titlist Mikhail Youzhny. Other seeded players were two-time Nottingham champion Ivo Karlović, Bergamo Challenger winner and 2007 Gstaad finalist Andreas Seppi, Nicolas Kiefer, Igor Andreev and Guillermo Cañas.

Finals

Singles

 Victor Hănescu defeated  Igor Andreev, 6–3, 6–4
It was Victor Hănescu's 1st career title.

Doubles

 Jaroslav Levinský /  Filip Polášek defeated  Stéphane Bohli /  Stanislas Wawrinka, 3–6, 6–2, [11–9]

External links
 Official website
 Singles draw
 Doubles draw